Irene Prador (née Peiser; 16 July 1911, in Vienna – 8 July 1996, in Berlin) was an Austrian-born actress and writer.

Biography
Prador was born as Irene Peiser, the daughter of Dr. Alfred Peiser and actress Rose Lissmann, and sister of actress Lilli Palmer. She emigrated to France in 1933, following the rise of Nazism; and appeared in cabaret there with her sister. She later worked in revue, film and theatre in England, America and Germany, and appeared in several programmes on BBC Television.

Filmography

1937: Let's Make a Night of It - Specialty Act (uncredited)
1937: Ad Lib (TV Movie)
1939: Rake's Progress (TV Movie) - Maria Bellini, of the Neapolitan Opera
1948: No Orchids for Miss Blandish - Olga-Johnny's Girl
1950: The Compelled People (TV Movie) - Emmy
1950: Lilli Marlene - Nurse Schmidt
1952: Something Money Can't Buy - German maid
1956: Lost - Mitzi
1956: The Battle of the River Plate - (uncredited)
1958: Carve Her Name with Pride - Prisoner (uncredited)
1958: The Snorkel - French Woman (uncredited)
1959: Jet Storm - Sophia Gelderen
1961: The Devil's Daffodil - Maisie (uncredited)
1962: The Saint (Episode: "The Charitable Countess") - Signora Vespa
1969: A Nice Girl Like Me - Mme. Dupont
1971: The Last Valley - Frau Hoffman
1972: Crown Court
1975: The Hiding Place - Wrochek
1976: To the Devil a Daughter - German Matron
1978: Holocaust (TV Mini-Series) - Maria Kalova
1982: Night Crossing - Mrs. Roseler
1983: Auf Wiedersehen Pet - Helmut's Mother
1986: Dear John (TV Series, 7 episodes) - Mrs Lemenski
1987: Treacle (BAFTA nominated: Best Short Film) - Rosa
1992: Lovejoy (Episode: "The Prague Sun") - Lila

References

External links
 

Austrian film actresses
Austrian women writers
1996 deaths
1911 births
Actresses from Vienna
Austrian stage actresses
Austrian cabaret performers
20th-century Austrian actresses
20th-century women writers
20th-century Austrian writers
Austrian emigrants to France